Pole Bridge Branch is a  long 3rd order tributary to Cherrystone Creek in Pittsylvania County, Virginia.

Course 
Pole Bridge Branch rises in a pond about 3 miles northeast of Redeye, Virginia and then flows generally south to join Cherrystone Creek about 2 miles northwest of Chatham.

Watershed 
Pole Bridge Branch drains  of area, receives about 45.8 in/year of precipitation, has a wetness index of 399.70, and is about 41% forested.

See also 
 List of Virginia Rivers

References 

Rivers of Virginia
Rivers of Pittsylvania County, Virginia
Tributaries of the Roanoke River